Vysotsky is the name of a skyscraper in Yekaterinburg. It is the third-tallest building in Russia outside of Moscow.

History 

Vysotsky architecture business center and semi-skyscraper was built in 2011. It has 54 floors, total height: 188.3 m (618 ft). The business center Vysotsky hit the Guinness Book of Records, having become "The tallest multifunctional business center in the Ural-Siberian and Central-Asian regions." 

An open sightseeing platform on the 52nd floor at the height of  offers a panoramic view of the city. The building serves as a nice orientation point when lost in the city.

The business center Vysotsky is named after Vladimir Vysotsky, a Soviet poet, musician, and actor. Also, it is a play on words: vysoky means "tall" in Russian. Behind the building is a bronze sculpture of Vladimir Vysotsky and his third wife, the French actress Marina Vlady.

See also 
 List of tallest buildings in Russia

References

External links
 Official Vysotsky Business Center website—, 
 ULC-Russia.com: Yekaterinburg & the Ural region—

Buildings and structures in Yekaterinburg
Skyscraper office buildings in Russia
Vladimir Vysotsky
Office buildings completed in 2011
2011 establishments in Russia